Nenjiang City, formerly Nenjiang County, is a county-level city under the administration of Heihe prefecture-level city in northwestern Heilongjiang province, China. The city seat is Nenjiang Town. Land area , population 500,000.

History
Nenjiang (also known as Mergen at the time) was the capital (seat of the Military Governor) of Heilongjiang Province in 1690–1699.

Geography and climate

Nenjiang has a monsoon-influenced humid continental climate (Köppen Dwb), with long, harsh, but dry winters, and short, very warm summers. Around 80% of the annual precipitation occurs from June to September. With monthly percent possible sunshine ranging from 53% in July to 74% in February, sunshine is generous year-round, totalling 2,726 hours annually.

Climate

Administrative divisions 
Nenjiang City is divided into 9 towns and 5 townships. 
9 towns
 Nenjiang, Yilaha, Shuangshan, Duobaoshan, Haijiang, Qianjin, Zhangfu, Keluo, Huolongmen
5 townships
 Linjiang, Lianxing, Baiyun, Taxi, Changjiang

References

County level divisions of Heilongjiang
Cities in Heilongjiang
Heihe